The 1500 metres speed skating event was part of the speed skating at the 1924 Winter Olympics programme. The competition was held on Sunday, January 27, 1924. Twenty-seven speed skaters from ten nations were due to compete, but five athletes withdrew, so in the end twenty-two speed skaters from nine nations competed. The Finnish athlete Asser Wallenius fell and did not finish the race.

Medalists

Records
These were the standing world and Olympic records (in seconds) prior to the 1924 Winter Olympics.

The following records were set during this competition.

Results

The event was held Sunday at midday.

Notes

References

External links
Official Olympic Report
 

Speed skating at the 1924 Winter Olympics